Amblyopone aberrans is a species of ant in the genus Amblyopone, endemic to Australia. The species was described by Wheeler in 1927.

References

External links

Amblyoponinae
Hymenoptera of Australia
Insects described in 1927
Insects of Australia